Giovanni Sollima (born 24 October 1962 in Palermo, Sicily, Italy) is an Italian composer and cellist.  He was born into a family of musicians and studied cello with Giovanni Perriera and composition with his father, Eliodoro Sollima, at the Conservatorio di Palermo, where he graduated with highest honors. He later studied with Antonio Janigro and Milko Kelemen at the Musikhochschule Stuttgart and at the Universität Mozarteum Salzburg.

As a composer, Sollima's influences are wide ranging, taking in jazz and rock, as well as various ethnic traditions from the Mediterranean area. Sollima's music is influenced by minimalism, with his compositions often featuring modal melodies and repetitive structures. Because his works are characterized by a more diverse and eclectic approach to material than the early American minimalist composers, the American critic Kyle Gann has called Sollima a postminimalist composer.

Sollima has collaborated with the American poet and musician Patti Smith, appearing on her records and performing with her in concert. He also collaborates with the Silk Road Project.

Music for chamber ensembles

Musica per sonar a più stromenti dialogando fra antica et moderna (1979)
Notturno (1980)
Maithuna (1981)
Orgy (1982)
Tantra (1983)
The force that through the green fuse drives the flower by Dylan Thomas (1985)
La luna (1986)
Variazioni su un plastico (1986)
4 works by Andy Warhol (1987)
6 caprices (1987)
Flowers (1987)
Primo frammento da "Empedocles" (First fragment of Empedocles), text by Michele Perriera (1989)
Siciliana con variazione (1989)
E gli alberi germinarono, e gli uomini e le donne... (1990)
In B (1991)
Match Suite (1991)
Segno in memory of the victims of the Capaci massacre (1992)
Africa, quintet for 2 violins, viola and 2 cellos (1992)
Anno uno in memory of the victims of the via D'Amelio massacre (1993)
Violoncelles, vibrez! version for 6 cellos(1993)
Heimat-terra (1993)
The Songlines (1993)
Angeli nel vulcano (1994)
A gift (1994)
Spasimo (1995)
Sento il canto in curva (1995)
Il Tracciato di Marta (1995)
Voyage (1995)
John Africa (1996)
Studio per Aquilastro (1997)
Chi è (1997)
Lam (1997)
Yafù (1997)
Aquilarco, text by Christopher Knowles (1997–98)
Lamentatio ("Lamentation") (1998)
Pasolini fragments (1998)
Reperto n. 12 from a fragment by Schubert (1998)
S'ota love dance (1998)
A view from the bottom, text by Mumia Abu Jamal (1998)
Concerto rotondo (1998)
I canti (1998)
The meetings of the waters (1999)
Millennium Bug (1999)
Intersong I (1999)
Subsongs (1999)
L'interpretazione dei sogni (The interpretation of dreams) (1999)
Leonardo's ornithoptherus (1999)
Alone (1999)
Hell (2000)
Contrafactus (2000)
Il Tracciato (2000)
Viaggio in Italia, texts by Michelangelo Buonarroti, Giordano Bruno and Francesco Borromini (2000)
Intersong II (2001)
J. Beuys Song (2001)
Vram, text by Alessandro Baricco (2002)
Pillole (2002)
Bêri (2002)
Terra Aria from "B song" (2003)
Terra Danza from "B song" (2003)
Cello Tree from "B song" (2003)
Il bell'Antonio, Tema III

Orchestral works

Concerto grosso (1976)
String concerto No. 1 (1978)
String concerto No. 1 (1979)
Raccapriccio (1979)
Le Paradis Submergé (1981)
Two Nocturnes (1984)
Musivum (1987)
Le notti bianche (1988)
The Columbus Egg (1990)
In B, version for Jazz Band (1991)
Cello Concerto (1992)
Africa (1992)
Agnus Dei (1993)
Violoncelles, vibrez! (1993)
Sinfonia in luoghi aperti (Open Air Symphony) (1994)
MW (1994)
Angeli (Angels) (1994)
Adagio (1995)
 Cartolina (Postcard) (1995)
Aria in rosso (Aria in red) (1996)
Lam & Dan (1998)
All the W (1998)
Guitar chemistry (1999)
Alleluja (1999)
Casanova (2000)
Canti rocciosi, with texts by Dino Buzzati, Dante Alighieri, Ernest Hemingway and 'street rhymes' in Sicilian, Italian and Ladin (2001)
Contrafactus (2001)
Tempeste e ritratti (Storms and portraits) (2001)

Opera and ballet
Notti di Grazia (1991) - Melodramma in un atto, libretto by Dario Oliveri
Mittersill 101 variazioni sul caso Anton Webern (1996) - Video opera, text by Dario Oliveri, after Goethe
Cenerentola Azzurro (1994) - Text by Dario Oliveri
Casanova (2000) - Choreography by Karole Armitage
Matteo Ricci — Li Madou (2001) - Melologue, text by Filippo Mignini
J. Beuys song (2001) - Choreography by Carolyn Carlson
Ellis Island (2002) - Opera in 2 acts, libretto by Roberto Alajmo

Incidental music for the theatre
Match (1990)
Cordelia & co. (1991)
3 pezzi for " Il sogno spezzato di Rita Atria" (1993)
3 pezzi for "Pippo Fava" (1994)
I Pavoni (1997)

Installations
Imagining Prometheus (2003)
Luminaria (2003)

Discography (as composer)
Aquilarco - Polygram Records - #462546 (1998)
Spasimo - Agora - #216 (2000)
John Africa in "La formula del fiore" - Sensible Records: SSB 012, (1999)
Viaggio in Italia - Agorà (AG 259) (2000)
Violoncelles, vibrez! -  Agorà: AG 155. (1998)
Violoncelles, vibrez! (on Tracing Astor: Gidon Kremer Plays Astor Piazzolla) - Nonesuch: 79601 (2001)
Canti rocciosi - I suoni delle Dolomiti (2001)
Works - Sony Music: DED 519769 2 (2005)
Heimat Terra, Fiddle Files (on The Magic of Wood: From Lutherie to Music) - Dynamic: 5092 (2005)We were trees - Sony/BGM 88697314382  (2008)Astrolabioanima - Odd Times Record: OTR 001  (2008)Sonnets et Rondeaux'' - Cobra Records: CBRA 35 (2012)

Notes

The link posted that purports to be for Giovanni Sollima's (music) website is not for his website. Instead it will take you to the website of a health/cosmetics practitioner also called Giovanni Sollima.

External links

Giovanni Sollima at allmusic.com

Video

On 9 May 2007 Lasse Gjertsen released a two-part music video for two of Giovanni Sollima's pieces:
Giovanni Sollima's "Terra Aria"
Giovanni Sollima's "Concerto Rotondo"
"Musik auf Eis"

1962 births
Living people
Musicians from Palermo
Italian classical cellists
Composers from Sicily
Mozarteum University Salzburg alumni
State University of Music and Performing Arts Stuttgart alumni
20th-century Italian composers
21st-century Italian composers
20th-century cellists
21st-century cellists